Morley Heights / Parkview is a neighborhood in Duluth, Minnesota, United States.

Snively Road and Glenwood Street serve as main routes in the community.

Amity Creek flows through the neighborhood.

History
The neighborhood is named for industrialist Albert Morley Marshall.

Portions of Morley Heights were originally created in the 1920s, as planned housing for employees of the Marshall–Wells Hardware Company. 80 homes were sold to employees at cost.

Adjacent Neighborhoods

(Directions following those of Duluth's general street grid system, not actual geographical coordinates)

Lakeside – Lester Park (east)
Congdon Park (south)
Woodland (west)
Hunter's Park (west)
City of Rice Lake (north)
Lakewood Township (north)

External links and references
City of Duluth website
City map of neighborhoods (PDF)

Duluth–Superior metropolitan area
Neighborhoods in Duluth, Minnesota